Mikayil Yusifov  (born 24 April 1982) is a retired Azerbaijani professional football goalkeeper.

Career
Yusifov joined FK Khazar Lenkoran from MOIK Baku before the 2005–06 season. He later transferred to Kartalspor in Turkey before the 2007–08 season.  His contract with Kartalspor was cancelled by mutual agreement on 15 August 2008. Shortly after he was presented as the new goalkeeper for Standard Baku.

Yusifov made his debut with the Azerbaijan national football team as a second-half substitute in a friendly against T&T on 23 February 2005.

References

External links 
 
 Profile at TFF.org

1982 births
Living people
Azerbaijani footballers
Azerbaijan international footballers
Azerbaijani expatriate footballers
Expatriate footballers in Turkey
Azerbaijani expatriate sportspeople in Turkey
Kartalspor footballers
Association football goalkeepers
Footballers from Baku
FK Standard Sumgayit players
MOIK Baku players
Azerbaijan Premier League players
TFF First League players